The 2003 Chicago Marathon was the 26th running of the annual marathon race in Chicago, United States and was held on October 12. The elite men's race was won by Kenya's Evans Rutto in a time of 2:05:50 hours and the women's race was won by Russia's Svetlana Zakharova in 2:23:07.

Results

Men

Women

References

Results. Association of Road Racing Statisticians. Retrieved 2020-04-10.

External links 
 Official website

Chicago Marathon
Chicago
2000s in Chicago
2003 in Illinois
Chicago Marathon
Chicago Marathon